The 2022 CrossFit Games is the 16th iteration of the annual competition in the sport of CrossFit held from August 3 to August 7, 2022, in Madison, Wisconsin. Both Justin Medeiros and Tia-Clair Toomey repeated their 2021 win in their respective men's and women's competitions, while CrossFit Mayhem Freedom won the team competition.

The qualification process for the 2022 CrossFit Games was similar to the one used in 2021, starting with the Open, followed by the quarterfinals, the semifinals, and a last-chance qualifier. The prize pool increased to $2,845,000 across all divisions this year; the elite individual winners received the same prize money but for the first time, all 40 top men and women would receive a share of the prize purse, as well as podium finishers of five Adaptive divisions.

This season Justin Bergh became the General Manager Of Sport and Adrian Bozman the Director of Competition, taking over from Dave Castro who had been responsible for the Games since its inception. Bozman introduced a number of new movements at the Games which proved challenging for a number of athletes. 

This season Roman Khrennikov participated in person at the Games for the first time despite qualifying for the Games four previous times, and Ricky Garard returned after a 4-year ban for drug use. Khrennikov and Garard was placed 2nd and 3rd respectively, with 2021 winner Justin Medeiros taking the crown for the second time in a tightly fought contest. On the women's side, Tia-Clair Toomey prevailed over challenger Mal O'Brien who, at the age of 18, became the youngest-ever competitor to reach the podium. Toomey's 6th consecutive win was a new record, making her the only person to win six individual titles at the Games.

Qualification 
The qualification system is broadly similar to that used for the 2021 CrossFit Games, with some adjustments.

Open 
The Games season started with the Open, which took place over three weeks from February 24 to March 14, 2022. The number of athletes registered for the Open increased again this year to 294,980. This is the first Games season not to be programmed by Dave Castro after he was dismissed ahead of the Open, although the workouts for the Open were mostly similar to those pre-arranged by Castro with some modifications (e.g. the Shuttle Run was moved to the quarterfinal). Only three workouts were scheduled for this year's Open. Saxon Panchik and Mallory O'Brien were the respective male and female winners of the Open.

Quarterfinals 
The top 10% of individual participants and top 25& of teams from the Open of each continent qualified for the Quarterfinals. The individual Quarterfinals were again held online like the Open, with 5 workouts released all at the same time to be completed by individual athletes from March 24 to March 27, but with the scores for individual workouts to be submitted at specified time. The team Quarterfinals were held on April 8–10, 2022, while the age group Quarterfinals were held on  April 21–24, 2022.  A new element, the Shuttle Run, was introduced this year for the individual quarterfinals, but caused some controversy after many failed to be penalized for not performing the unfamiliar workout correctly.

Semifinals 
This year, in order to introduce some level of uniformity, all semifinal competitions would have six workouts each, two of which are identically programmed by CrossFit for all the semifinals. The prize purse for the semifinals remained the same as that for the 2021 Games. Athletes who qualified for multiple stages, such as Individual, Team, or Age Group, can only participate in one. Ten Semifinals were scheduled to be held on six continents over four weeks starting May 20, 2022: four in North America (Syndicate Crown, Mid-Atlantic CF Challenge, Granite Games, Atlas Games), two in Europe (Lowland Throwdown, Strength in Depth), one each in South America (CF Copa Sur), Asia (Far East Throwdown), Africa (Fittest In Cape Town), and Oceania (Torian Pro). 30 men, 30 women, and 20 teams competed in each semifinal. The number of qualifiers stayed unchanged from 2021: 5 men and women from each North American and European semifinal, three from Oceania, two from Asia and South America, and one from Africa.

Qualified individuals 

Athlete tested positive for banned substances
Backfilled athletes
On March 1, 2022, CrossFit announced they will not recognise athletes from Russia or Belarus as a result of Russian violations of the Olympic truce through invasion of Ukraine during the binding truce. Athletes thereby will compete as neutral athletes.

Individual competitions 
Events in the CrossFit Games are scheduled to be held in Madison, Wisconsin, from August 3 to August 7, 2022.

August 3, 2022

Event 1: Bike to Work 

75 toes-to-bars
5-mile bike
75 chest-to-bar pull-ups
5-mile bike

Ricky Garard and Haley Adams were the respective winners of the first event.

Event 3: Skill Speed Medley 
The field is reduced in 3 rounds, top 20 progress to second round, top 5 to the final round:
First round
3 M/2 F pegboard ascents
75 unbroken single-unders
10 unbroken single-leg squats on left leg, 10 unbroken single-leg squats on right
Handstand walk course
Second round
2 M/1 F strict pegboard ascents
50 unbroken double-unders
10 unbroken single-leg squats on left leg, 10 unbroken single-leg squats on right
Handstand walk course, pirouette start
Final round
1 strict pegboard ascent
25 double-under crossovers
10 unbroken single-leg squats on left leg, 10 unbroken single-leg squats on right
Handstand walk course, low start

Most of the athletes had difficulties with a new element introduced this year: double-under crossovers. Nick Mathew, the male winner of the event, was one of only two men to complete the event. Danielle Brandon was the female winner, although none of the women could get to the single-leg squat and handstand walk course. Emma Lawson became the youngest-ever person to wear the white jersey after this event.

Event 4: Elizabeth Elevated 
21-15-9-9-9 reps for time of:
Squat cleans (woman 95 lb, men 135 lb)
Dips with parallel bar traverses

The dips with parallel bar traverses is another new element introduced this year. Patrick Vellner won the event in the men's competition, while Arielle Loewen won the women's.

August 4, 2022

Event 2: Shuttle to Overhead 
Event 2 was delayed to the second day which is normally a rest day due to weather conditions. The event is split into two for scoring purposes, 2A for the run, 2B for the max jerks.

In 2 minutes, Run 400 m, Max jerks (Women: 200 lb, Men: 300 lb)
Rest 1 minute
In 3 minutes, Run 600 m, Max jerks (Women: 200 lb, Men: 300 lb)
Rest 2 minutes
In 4 minutes. Run 800 m, Max jerks (Women: 200 lb, Men: 300 lb)

Haley Adams and Uldis Upenieks were the respective female and male winner of the run portion, Tia-Clair Toomey and Jeffry Adler won the max jerks.

August 5, 2022

Event 5: The Capitol 

20 Pig flips (Women: 350 lb, Men: 510 lb)
3.5-mile run
200-m Jerry bag carry (Women: 70 lb, Men: 100 lb)
200-m Husafell carry (Women: 150 lb, Men: 200 lb)

Athletes started at the North Park of Alliant Energy Center, and finished at the top of the steps of Wisconsin State Capitol. Gabriela Migala and Ricky Garard won the women's and men's race respectively.

Event 6: Up and Over 
3 rounds for time:

12 muscle-ups
25 jump-overs (Women: 50-in log, 30-in box, 20-in Pig, Men: 50-in log, 42-in box, 20-in Pig)
30 GHD sit-ups

Then
84-ft weighted lunge (Women: 125-lb axle bar, Men:185-lb axle bar)

Unusually, Tia-Clair Toomey wore the white jersey at the 2022 CrossFit Games the first time only at Event 6 with two points in front. She won to extend her lead slightly over second-place Mal O'Brien. Saxon Panchik won the men's event.

Event 7: Echo Press 
For time:

30/25 Echo Bike calories
10 block HSPU (Women: 2-in deficit, Men: 3.5-in deficit)
20/15 Echo Bike calories
10 block HSPU (Women: 2-in deficit, Men: 3.5-in deficit)
20/15 Echo Bike calories
10 block HSPU (Women: 2-in deficit, Men: 3.5-in deficit)
30/25 Echo Bike calories

Will Moorad and Alexis Raptis won the men's and women's event respectively. Significantly, Ricky Garard faltered in this event, reducing his lead significantly, while Toomey extended her lead over young challengers O'Brien and Emma Lawson.

August 6, 2022

Event 8: Rinse 'N' Repeat 
The swim event took place at an indoor pool this year. (Venue: Nicholas Recreation Center & Soderholm Family Aquatic Center, University of Wisconsin-Madison)

Every 2 minutes:

50-yard swim
8-cal Ski Erg (Add 2 calories each round for 6 rounds, then complete as many calories as possible for rounds 7 and 8)

The event was won by Lucy Campbell in the women's competition and Roman Khrennikov in the men's.

Event 9: Hat Trick 

3 rounds for total time of:

Sprint
20 wall-ball shots (Women 14-lb ball to 11 ft, Men: 20-lb ball to 12 ft)
6 dumbbell snatches  (Women: 70-lb DB, Men: 100-lb DB)

Rest 4 minutes between rounds

Ellie Turner and Guilherme Malheiros won the event. Justin Medeiros came third (after time adjustment) and after this event, took over the lead from Ricky Garard who had led since the beginning.

Event 10: Sandbag Ladder 
1-rep-max sandbag-to-shoulder (Women: 160-250 lb, Men: 240-340 lb)

Athletes needed to lift the sandbag onto one shoulder and let go of one hand to show control. When multiple athletes failed to lift at the same weight, the tie-break was to throw 3 sandbags (Women: 50, 100, 150 lbs, Men: 100, 150, 200 lbs) over a yoke in the shortest time.

Dani Speegle won the event for the women, while there was a tie for first place between Malheiros and Nick Matthew for the men./

August 7, 2022

Event 11: The Alpaca 
for time:

126-ft sled push, decreasing in load
2 legless rope climbs*
20 kettlebell clean and jerks
42-ft sled push with 2 KBs
2 legless rope climbs*
15 kettlebell clean and jerks
42-ft sled push with 4 KBs
2 legless rope climbs*
10 kettlebell clean and jerks
42-ft sled push with 6 KBs

Women: Six 24-kg kettlebells
Men: Six 32-kg kettlebells

The rope climb was removed due to weather conditions. Roman Khrennikov won his second event at the Games, while Laura Horvath won her first of this Games.

Event 12: Back Nine 
For time:

54-ft yoke carry (Women: 485-lb, Men: 665-lb)
2 front squats (Women: 215-lb, Men: 315-lb)
3 deadlifts  (Women: 315-lb, Men: 475-lb)
2 front squats
54-ft yoke carry

This event featured the heaviest yoke and deadlift ever programmed at the Games. Laura Horvath continued with her surge up the ranking with another win, while Jeffrey Adler won in the men's competition.

Event 13: Jackie Pro 
For time:

1,000-m row (must be completed in 3 minutes 15 seconds for men, 3 minutes 40 seconds for women)
50 thrusters (Women: 65 lb, Men: 95 lb)
30 bar muscle-ups

Lucy Campbell and Lazar Đukić were the respective female and male winners of the event.

Justin Medeiros was crowned the male winner of the 2022 CrossFit Games. Medeiros did not win any event but won the competition through consistence performance; this is the first time since 2007 when the male winner of the Games did not win an event. Tia-Clair Toomey was the female winner for the sixth time, making her the only athlete, male or female, to win 6 individual titles. CrossFit Mayhem Freedom won the teams competition.

For the first time at the Games, two athletes, one male and one female, were named Rookies of the Year. They were Nick Mathew and Emma Lawson.

The list of national champions based how far they progress the furthest in the CrossFit Games season were released after the Games in December.

Team competition
The team competition took place over 5 days:

August 3, 2022
Event 1: Biker Bob
Event 2: Strong

August 4, 2022
Event 3''': Fast
Event 4: Pegs & P-Bar

August 5, 2022
Event 5: Muscle Pig
Event 6: Handstand Machine

August 6, 2022
Event 7: Rinse 'N' Repeat
Event 8: Dumbbell Highball
Event 9: Payload

August 7, 2022
Event 10: Team 2-2-2-2
Event 11: Echo Worm

Podium finishers

Individuals and teams

Masters men

Masters women

Teens

Adaptive divisions

References

External links 
 CrossFit Games official website

2022 in sports in Wisconsin
CrossFit
CrossFit Games
CrossFit Games
CrossFit Games